Peter David LeBlanc (born December 24, 1938) is a former chartered accountant and former political figure in New Brunswick, Canada. He represented Kennebecasis in the Legislative Assembly of New Brunswick from 1995 to 1999 as a Liberal member.

Peter is now the owner and co-operator of a Christmas tree farm and apple orchard located in Quispamsis NB, Kennebecasis Apple Orchard.

He was born December 24, 1938, in Montreal, Quebec, the son of Paul LeBlanc and Beatrice Mary MacDonald. In 1973, he married Carolyn Crowther. LeBlanc served as Minister of Supply and Services from 1997 to 1998. He had been a member of the town council for Rothesay, New Brunswick. LeBlanc was defeated when he ran for reelection in 1999.

References
 Canadian Parliamentary Guide, 1997, Kathryn O'Handley 

1938 births
Living people
20th-century Canadian politicians
Canadian accountants
Members of the Executive Council of New Brunswick
New Brunswick Liberal Association MLAs
New Brunswick municipal councillors
Politicians from Montreal